Kyshoen Jarrett (born May 4, 1993) is an American football coach who is currently a graduate assistant for the Virginia Tech Hokies football team. He was also a former safety who played for the Washington Redskins of the National Football League (NFL), who drafted him in the sixth round of the 2015 NFL Draft after playing college football for the Hokies.

Jarrett's NFL career lasted just one season after he retired due to suffering severe nerve damage in his shoulder at the end of the season. He served as an assistant coach for the Redskins in 2019 before becoming an executive for the Hokies in 2021.

Professional career

Washington Redskins
Jarrett attended East Stroudsburg High School South in East Stroudsburg, Pennsylvania before attending Virginia Tech. He was drafted by the Washington Redskins in the sixth round (181st overall) of the 2015 NFL Draft. He signed his four-year rookie contract on May 11, 2015. During the regular season finale against the Dallas Cowboys, Jarret suffered severe damage to his brachial plexus during a helmet-to-helmet collision with running back Darren McFadden. Unable to fully regain strength in his arm in the months following the injury, he was waived by the team before the start of training camp in 2016.

Coaching and executive
In 2018, Jarret began a coaching internship with the Redskins, and was hired full-time as a defensive quality control coach the following year. He was not retained when the team assembled a new coaching staff following the hiring of Ron Rivera. In June 2021, Jarret joined the Virginia Tech Hokies as assistant director of player personnel.

References

External links
Virginia Tech Hokies staff bio
Virginia Tech Hokies player bio

1993 births
Living people
African-American players of American football
American football safeties
People from East Stroudsburg, Pennsylvania
Players of American football from Pennsylvania
Sportspeople from the New York metropolitan area
Virginia Tech Hokies football players
Washington Redskins players
Washington Redskins coaches
21st-century African-American sportspeople